Game Ka Na Ba?, formerly Pilipinas Game Ka Na Ba (stylized as Game KNB?) is a Philippine game show created by ABS-CBN. The main goal of the game is to win 2 million pesos (either 1 million, progressive jackpot, or a brand new car in earlier versions) by answering trivia questions.

The show first aired on October 8, 2001, as Game Ka Na Ba? on the primetime block of ABS-CBN. It was renamed Million-Million Na! Game Ka Na Ba? the following year after a multi-million progressive jackpot was introduced. In 2003, it was renamed Next Level Na! Game Ka Na Ba?, and a physical round was introduced. The show moved to the noontime block on November 15, 2004 and was renamed Pilipinas, Game Ka Na Ba?; it was hosted by Kris Aquino from its premiere until March 3, 2007 to concentrate on Kapamilya, Deal or No Deal. She was replaced by Edu Manzano on March 5, 2007, until the end of its original run on October 23, 2009. It also aired internationally on The Filipino Channel.

The show was revived on October 12, 2020, on Jeepney TV. It is hosted by Robi Domingo.

The KNB in the stylized title of the game show stands for ka na ba ("are you" in English), making the full title Pilipinas, Game Ka Na Ba? (literally, Philippines, Are You Ready [to Play]?). The KNB is derived from SMS language, along with the Nokia-derived chiptune theme song which was in keeping with the original game show's cellular phone-centric theme at the time when text messaging started becoming popular in the Philippines.

Hosts
Kris Aquino hosted the show since its debut on October 8, 2001, until March 3, 2007, when she took a maternity leave for being seven months pregnant and decided to focus on Kapamilya, Deal or No Deal. She was replaced by Edu Manzano on March 5, 2007,  until the original run's final episode on October 23, 2009.

Several guest hosts were also featured throughout the original run of the show. Korina Sanchez became the guest host on the Game Ka Na Ba? finale featuring Aquino as a player. On Next Level Na, Game Ka Na Ba?, Dominic Ochoa, Isko "Brod Pete" Salvador, Long Mejia, Charlene Gonzales and Marvin Agustin became guest co-hosts.

Toni Gonzaga and Vhong Navarro hosted the pre-seventh anniversary special of Pilipinas, Game Ka Na Ba? from October 31 to November 3, 2008.

On October 2, 2020, Robi Domingo was announced as the host of the revival of the show.

History
Pilipinas, Game Ka Na Ba? has undergone several formats throughout its eight-year run:

2001–2002: Game Ka Na Ba? (1st incarnation)

In Game Ka Na Ba? (stylized as Game KNB?), there were six levels with a top prize of ₱1,000,000.

 Elimination round
There were 3 five-player groups, and five yes-or-no questions were asked. In every question, contestants with incorrect answers were eliminated after the correct answer was revealed. If there were more than two contestants who answered correctly by the end of the fifth and final question, the two fastest contestants received ₱10,000 and advanced to the Face-Off round.

 Face-Off round
Nine possible answers for the nine questions were displayed on the board. Players had to press their buzzer to answer the question. The player with the most correct answers received a guaranteed amount of ₱100,000 and advanced to the Jackpot round.

 Jackpot round
The player was given nine categories on the board, and had to pick one for each round. There were five multiple-choice questions for the first three rounds: there were four possible answers in the Showcase round, three in the ₱300,000 round, and two in the ₱500,000 round. The player could change their answer until they said "Sure na!". The player had to answer three out of five questions correctly to win the round. At the end of each round, the player was given an option to walk away with their winnings or continue to the next round. If the player did not correctly answer three questions, they dropped back to ₱100,000 and the game ended. In the ₱1,000,000 round, there was only one question but no possible answers are given; the player had to give the exact correct answer to win, or the game ended with the player with ₱100,000 in winnings. During special episodes, it was known as "Solo Round".

2002–2003: Million-Million Na! Game Ka Na Ba?

The format of Million-Million Na! Game Ka Na Ba? was similar to the previous one, but the ₱1,000,000 jackpot was replaced with a progressive jackpot. The progressive jackpot started at ₱1,000,000, and ₱100,000 was added to it each time someone fails to win it. When the progressive jackpot was won, it returned to ₱1,000,000 in the following episode.

A brand new car was also added as a top prize in this format. The player could choose to try for the progressive jackpot or the brand new car.

During the last weeks of its incarnation in 2003, Elimination and Face-Off Rounds were removed.

2003–2004: Next Level Na! Game Ka Na Ba?
On September 24, 2003, Next Level Na, Game Ka Na Ba? (Next Level Na, Game KNB?) debuted. It was roughly the same format as Million-Million Na, but physical and luck-based games were added in addition to the regular question based games such as Talino (Intellect), Tsamba (Luck) and Tapang (Strength). The next relaunch occurred in 2004 but aired in the daytime block.

2004–2009: Pilipinas, Game Ka Na Ba?
The show has gone through several contest formats. Edu Manzano revealed that the yearly changing of formats was because they wanted to retain their audience by taking away the sawa (lit. getting disinterested over something due to frequent exposure) factor.

2004–2006: Pyramid format

The format ran from November 15, 2004 to June 10, 2006, and used the pyramid stage and the Tarantarium, which was a room filled with a wide selection of books and other reference materials that the ten contestants chosen via electronic raffle and text registration would be housed in before the show started. Each contestant was given 30 minutes to review different topics for the questions to be asked in the game's elimination round. A maximum of two questions (such as "One-on-One Tayo" and "Dibdiban Na!") would be asked to every contestant. The first four contestants to answer both questions correctly moved on to the next round, but if they answered wrong (either in the "One-on-One Tayo" or both questions in the later version) they would be eliminated, regardless if the first four were already called.
 
The pyramid stage was designed to look like an actual pyramid composed of 15 hexagons (resembling a honeycomb). Every contestant answered a series of questions and once right, would move up until they reached the top, but their path could change if there was a challenge offer, where the contestant must say "Umalis Ka!" and be given a question; if they answer correctly they stole the spot of the contestant who was originally placed there, who took one step back, and would remain in that spot if they answered incorrectly. The first contestant who reached the top first was automatically given ₱50,000 and a chance to beat the defending winner. A clincher round decided on who would play for the Million Peso Jackpot Round, with the defending winner choosing a question from a category to ask the challenger. If the challenger gave all the correct answers, they were declared the winner and kept the prize; answering incorrectly meant the challenger lost and they left with half of the ₱50,000 prize, and the defending winner advanced to the next round.

The winner of the clincher round advanced to the Million Peso Jackpot Round, where they answered a question from a category they chose (e.g. Arts & Literature, Geography & Nature, etc.). The contestant was allowed to use the Tarantarium for 60 seconds and had to answer immediately afterwards. If they gave an incorrect answer, they had to return in the succeeding episodes and increase their winnings. If they answered correctly, they won ₱1,000,000 and a new defending winner would be named.

2005–2008: Pasko Na, Game Ka Na Ba?
In December 2005, ABS-CBN aired a special primetime Christmas version of Pilipinas, Game Ka Na Ba? called Pasko Na, Game Ka Na Ba?, where celebrities played for charity, which carried on the Pyramid format.

In celebration of the sixth anniversary of the show in November 2007, Pasko Na, Game Ka Na Ba? was revived for two weeks and used the Atras-Abante format. Past players who were one correct answer away from winning the jackpot were invited back to play for charity.

The title was used again in December 2008 using the Word-Picture Format.

2006–2008: Atras-Abante format

The Atras-Abante format ran from June 12, 2006 to May 3, 2008. It was the last format that Aquino hosted. On March 5, 2007, Aquino left all of her ABS-CBN shows, with Manzano permanently replacing her on Pilipinas, Game Ka Na Ba? due to her pregnancy leave. Prior to the formal announcement of Manzano as the new host, Charlene Gonzales became a pinch-hitter for Aquino in February 2007.

The format carried some aspects of the pyramid format, particularly that contestants had to succeed the defending winner. Ten contestants registered via text message and would compete at an elimination round, of which only half of them would advance to the next round. The elimination round was played by the contestants, where nine categories and letters of the alphabet were randomly selected. The letters correspond to the first letter of the answer about a certain category. Those who answered correctly would move on, while those who answered incorrectly were eliminated, but others would try to steal to answer.
 
The second round was called the Atras-Abante round, where the five contestants from the elimination round answered series of questions and the two contestants that reached the Yellow Line moved on to the next round; the first one to reach the line first received an additional ₱10,000. Each contestant who answered correctly have 2 options and 2 Atras Powers: they could say "Abante Ako!" and advance one step (with a maximum of four steps to reach the Yellow Line) or would say "Atras si [contestant's name]!" and could force one or two players to move back one space from their current position.

The two contestants who reached the Yellow Line first in the Atras-Abante round would enter a free-for-all with the defending winner in a Knock-Out or Challenge Round. Three sets of words are shown; the defending winner selected a set of words and a category would be given based on the chosen set. Each player was given 20 seconds of thinking time and they would take turns in answering, depending on how many correct answers the host needs. If a contestant gave a wrong answer, repeated an answer, or did not answer at all, the player would be eliminated and would also take a step back. The player who gave all the correct answers received an additional ₱30,000 while the last player who answered correctly moved on to the ₱1,000,000 Jackpot Round and received an additional ₱50,000. The other two players who do not advance took consolation prizes of ₱10,000 and ₱20,000.

In the ₱1,000,000 Jackpot Round, the defending winner was given eight categories and had 10 seconds to read all of them. After that, there would be six letters, three of which were already given by the host and the contestant would be given an additional three more. These letters represented the first letters of the six possible answers of a randomly selected category. "No Possible Answer" was displayed if the letter was invalid in each category. The goal was to get all six of them correctly in 60 seconds to win the ₱1,000,000 jackpot. If the contestant did not get all six, they would draw a bonus letter (that is a correct answer from the six) and took home a prize. This installment would be reused in the succeeding formats. The defending winner would defend their title in the following episode. The prize is automatically won in addition to the jackpot if the contestant gets all six right. The defending winner keeps playing until defeated in the Challenge Round or wins the jackpot in which he/she retires undefeated.

2008–2009: Word & Picture format

The Word & Picture format ran from May 5, 2008 to April 8, 2009. The show started with the elimination round. 30 contestants were situated in the gallery, one of which was the defending champion. A contestant was randomly chosen to answer a question, and they were eliminated if they did not answer or answered incorrectly. Once four players remain, the champion received a question. If the player did not get it right, more players were randomly chosen to answer the question until a correct answer was given. The five players went on to the next round; anyone who did not get chosen to answer a question would return the next episode to compete again.

The next round is the Pick-A-Word round, where an LED screen (Previously, Monitors) featured nine clue words to nine different questions, each with a different value (either ₱1,000, ₱3,000, and ₱5,000) and had to be answered in eight minutes. The first question and amount were chosen at random, while all others were chosen by the player. If the question was answered correctly, points are earned, while questions that went unanswered or were given the wrong answer deducted points. If the contestant got five consecutive correct answers, they won the money in the pot. Scores were represented numerically and in the form of platforms that raised or lowered the player accordingly. The three players with the highest scores went to the next round, while the others took home money equal to half their score.

The Take-A-Pic round worked almost exactly like the previous round, except pictures of famous people were used instead of words, and the amounts were higher (₱5,000, ₱7,000, and ₱10,000), and it lasted for five minutes. The highest-scoring player goes to the final round, and the remaining take home money equal to half their score. Below is an example of how the board is on this round:

In the final round, nine words are given. The player picks a word, and had to answer seven questions themed around that word in 60 seconds. If the seven questions were answered correctly, they would win the grand prize of ₱1,000,000. If the player does not get all seven right, they must pick from a set of envelopes, each containing the letters G, A, M, E, K, N, and B, which corresponds to one of the questions. If the player picks one that corresponded to a question they got right, the player won a showcase of prizes. The defending winner continues on the next episode until defeated.

2009: Team format

The Team Format was conceptualized and announced in late 2008. It ran from April 13 to October 23, 2009, and was a spin-off of the old Game Ka Na Ba group format. The format had tested eight teams of three players for a prize of ₱2,000,000. The game consisted of four rounds: "Elimination", "Taranta" (Panic), "Diskarte" (Strategy), and Jackpot rounds. The format showed a fresh combination of thrills, luck, teamwork, and excitement.

The elimination round will be started by eight team players with the following colors: red, orange, yellow, green, blue, violet, pink, gray, and black, composed of the previous episode's defending champion, and seven teams composed of those from the last episode (those who failed to answer for the elimination) and replacement teams for those who got eliminated from the previous episode. Each team is composed of three individuals, the game texter (the one who sent the text entry for studio contestant) and two chosen teammates.

Each team is geared up to be the first to run to and press their respective buzzers as a team. If a team answers correctly, they will move on for the second round (Taranta). If the team answers incorrectly, they will be sent to the "Tambay (Standby) Podium" to wait for any chance of being sent back to the game stage. Any "Tambay Podium" team can go back to the game if there's only one team left in the game platform but still no one to complete the 4 teams to move on for the second round. Any "Tambay Podium" team is considered eliminated from the game and won't come back for the next episode unless saved by the shortage of Round 2 teams. This round tests each team's agility and quick-thinking abilities.

Successful teams from the elimination round will be asked to sit on hydraulic seats, similar to those seen in roller-coasters, to play the "Taranta Round". All teams will be asked one question, but each individual will be given three different sets of choices. The order of answering individuals is random. Some questions might be harder than it sounds, thus adding the Panic Factor in the game. To add up for the distractions delivered by the game's lightings and music, each player will be sprayed with water and air, making it more difficult for each player to give the correct answer in the given 3-second timeframe. The top 2 teams with the highest number of correct answers will advance to the next round. By September 2009, Manzano would read the three choices before a player would answer.

If two teams tied, they were both given another question to find the option that didn't belong in the question. Each team could select one member to press the buzzer. The two losing teams will be eliminated and would not be brought back for the next episode.

The two remaining teams battled for the Jackpot round through the Diskarte round. Each team member was placed on top of individual mobile podiums, and had to answer questions to win the round. A correct answer advanced a team member one spot closer to the final platform through the mobile podium. If one member arrived at the third spot first, they received ₱10,000 as an individual bonus prize. When a team member was already at the third spot, their next correct answer allowed them to advance other teammates one spot forward. When all team members reached the third stage, they needed one last correct answer to win ₱50,000 and proceed to the Jackpot round. Each team is given three "Diskarte Powers" that could be used on the opposing team. A contestant from the team will say Sugod ako! (I will proceed!) when he or she does not want to use any of the powers, and it could only be used after a correct answer was given.

"Manigas Ka!" (Freeze!) – Forced a contestant to lose a turn or prevent them from answering the next question. This could be used by a teammate after a correct answer was given.
"Pass-sagot" (Pass the answer) – Allowed the team to choose one member and have them answer the question; if they answered correctly, he can advance one stage forward; otherwise, the contestant who called this power moved forward. This power could only be used when a question was being asked.
"Back-to-Base" – Forced the contestant to move back to the base spot. This power could only be used after a question has been answered correctly.

When the final round was completed, the team won ₱2,000,000 in cash. The team needed to answer five out of seven questions correctly. Each question starts by mentioning their categories. A team member familiar with the category had to say "Mine!" first before pressing their assigned buzzer. After saying "Mine!", the question was revealed, and the team member responsible had to provide an answer. If the contestant was sure about the answer, they would say "Sure Na!" (I'm sure!) before it was locked in as the final answer of all three members. If the contestant was not sure about the answer, they could consult the team for the answer, or have another member say "Mine!" so that the question can be answered by the new contestant. The team needed to answer these questions within 90 seconds. Each correct answer in the jackpot round receives ₱10,000. The team can pass up to two times.

2020–present: Game Ka Na Ba? (2nd incarnation)
On September 26, 2020, almost 11 years after the original run of the show ended on October 23, 2009, ABS-CBN hinted at the revival of the show on its cable channel Jeepney TV and the Kumu app. The show premiered on October 12, 2020, and a restyled version of the music from the first incarnation of the show is used. It is the first game show in the world to be played on a mobile app. Five multiple-choice questions must be answered by players on the Kumu app. Winners split the ₱10,000 jackpot.

The first season premiered on October 12, 2020, and ended on January 1, 2021, while Season 2 started on January 4, 2021 and ended on March 31, 2021, a day before the start of the Paschal Triduum of Holy Week in the Philippines. The third season premiered on April 19, 2021 and ended on July 16, 2021. The fourth season premiered on August 23, 2021 and ended on November 19, 2021. The fifth season premiered on February 19, 2022 in a different format with every episode releasing every 3rd Saturday.

Transmissions

Reception
Pilipinas, Game Ka Na Ba? was always a constant top-rater during its primetime run for ABS-CBN (usually taking #1 in primetime since it also became a phenomenon in the Philippines), and it was also a top-rater during its daytime run; it usually took #2 in the daytime ratings behind its lead-in show Wowowee.

Aftermath
According to an article by Philippine Entertainment Portal in October 2009, Pilipinas, Game Ka Na Ba? would return as a "seasonal" show as to the other ABS-CBN shows like Kapamilya, Deal or No Deal and The Singing Bee, though the game show's return is dubious as Manzano transferred to ABS-CBN's rival network, GMA Network. ABS-CBN also launched a new show titled It's Showtime on October 24, 2009.

Legacy

Papaya dance
A meme started by Game Ka Na Ba is the "Papaya Dance". In a previous version of the show, the "Atras-Abante" round was used to select the two players who would compete for the grand prize. The first player who made it to the round danced to the tune of "Papaya", a '70s pop jazz song by Urszula Dudziak. Due to the popularity of the song, Edu Manzano released a soundtrack, which became a certified hit, and was used as part of the soundtrack of Sakal, Sakali, Saklolo. After a few months, the Papaya dance became known worldwide when it was featured on MSNBC, Reuters, and ABC's Good Morning America.

Taglines
During Aquino's reign as Game Ka Na Ba?'s host, she turned famous taglines from the show that became known expressions for Filipinos. like "Korek!" or "May Tama Ka!".

Reruns
Reruns of the show with Manzano as its host from 2007 until 2009 airs on Jeepney TV and also streamed on Kapamilya Online Live on Facebook and YouTube.

Drag Race Philippines 
The title of Game KNB? and the line of Pilipinas, Game Ka Na Ba? was later alluded in the inaugural season of Drag Race Philippines' Snatch Game. The season 1, episode 6 of the franchise entitled "Snatch Game KNB?" references the game show with host Paolo Ballesteros asking the contestants "Pilipinas, Snatch game ka na ba?" similar to Kris and Edu's line.

Awards
 2002, 2003 & 2005 PMPC Star Awards for TV: Best Game Show Host (Kris Aquino)
 2003-2006 PMPC Star Awards for TV: Best Game Show
 Anak TV Seal 2006, 2007, 2008 & 2009 : Most Well-Liked TV Programs
 2007 & 2008 PMPC Star Awards for TV: Best Game Show
 2007 & 2008 PMPC Star Awards for TV: Best Game Show Host  (Edu Manzano)
 2008 & 2009 Gawad Tanglaw Para Sa Sining At Kultura: Best Game Show
 2008 & 2009 Gawad Tanglaw Para Sa Sining At Kultura: Best Game Show Host (Edu Manzano)
 2007 KBP Golden Dove Awards: Best Game Show
 2007 KBP Golden Dove Awards: Best Game Show Host (Edu Manzano)

See also
 List of programs broadcast by ABS-CBN
 List of programs broadcast by Jeepney TV
 Kapamilya, Deal or No Deal
 1 vs. 100

References

External links
Pilipinas, Game Ka Na Ba? at ABS-CBN.com (Archived)
 

Philippine game shows
ABS-CBN original programming
2001 Philippine television series debuts
2009 Philippine television series endings
2020 Philippine television series debuts
2020s Philippine television series
Filipino-language television shows
Television series revived after cancellation